Gavin Fraser (born 23 February 1972 in Liverpool, England) is an English-born, former Scotland Under 21 international, Scottish rugby union player who played for Glasgow Warriors at the Wing positions.

Biography
Gavin Fraser was Scottish-Qualified as his father, Gordon, was born in Scotland. Gordon Fraser moved to England in the 1960s settling in Corby, Northamptonshire, a town dubbed 'Little Scotland' due to the number of Scots that settled there. Gavin went to Merchant Taylors' Boys' School, Crosby and then, later, the University of Lincoln.

In 1990-91 season he played for Hull Ionians, but quickly moved to another amateur club Waterloo.

Fraser was selected to play for the Scottish Exiles Under 21 amateur district team in 1992 in the Under 21 Scottish Inter-District Championship. He later played for the full Scottish Exiles side, and won the Exiles first Championship in 1995.

He represented Scotland at Under 21 grade but never reached a full Senior cap though later made a Scotland Development XV side.

Moving from Waterloo, Fraser naturally signed for London Scottish. This move only was to last for one season before he moved on to another 'Exile' club.

He played for London Irish for one season: 1996-97 but moved from there to join Glasgow Warriors.

Fraser began his Glasgow career by playing in the pre-season friendly match against the Australian Super Rugby side Brumbies. Glasgow lost the match 6 - 22 and were unable to prevent the Australians' clean sweep against Scotland's district sides.

He played for Glasgow in the 1997-98 Heineken Cup. He came off the bench in Glasgow's away match to Swansea RFC. Similarly he came off the bench in Glasgow's away match to Leicester Tigers.

He also played for Glasgow in the 1997–98 Scottish Inter-District Championship; against Edinburgh Rugby on 19 October 1997, coming on for Craig Sangster at Full Back; and against Border Reivers on 24 October 1997, coming on for James Craig.

Whilst at the professional Glasgow club, Fraser was also able to play for an amateur club in Glasgow's district when not on Warriors duty. Fraser was assigned to Kilmarnock RFC. At the end of the season he was diagnosed with a prolapsed disc and his Glasgow contract had expired. Due to the SRU's cost exercise of the merger of Scotland's 4 district clubs into 2, 43 professional players including 6 Scotland internationalists lost their club - Fraser's contract was not renewed. However he was free to move outwith Glasgow's district and after treatment signed with another amateur club Watsonians. He played for the Edinburgh club from 1998-2000.

Gavin stayed in Glasgow till 2005 when he moved back to Northamptonshire. He played rugby in friendly matches and represented 'Scottish Legend' sides.

In 2008, Fraser played for the Nottingham Panthers Legends team.

In 2020 Gav is due to represent team G&T in the annual merseytri team swim run where along with his dashing team mate he is considered a favourite.

References

External links
 EPC Profile

1972 births
Living people
Glasgow Warriors players
Kilmarnock RFC players
London Irish players
London Scottish F.C. players
Rugby union players from Liverpool
Scottish Exiles (rugby union) players
Scottish rugby union players
Waterloo R.F.C. players
Watsonians RFC players
Rugby union wings